Itsaso Nabaskues Lasheras (born 6 October 1990) is a Spanish football midfielder, who plays for Oiartzun KE of Spain's Primera División. She previously played for Real Sociedad and Athletic Club.

She played at the 2007 U-19 European Championship.

In May 2016 Nabaskues suffered a serious knee injury while playing for Oiartzun against FC Barcelona. She was frustrated at having to wait until the following October for her surgery.

References

External links
 Profile at Athletic Bilbao
 Profile at La Liga 
 

1990 births
Living people
Spanish women's footballers
Primera División (women) players
Añorga KKE players
Athletic Club Femenino players
Real Sociedad (women) players
Oiartzun KE players
Footballers from San Sebastián
Oud-Heverlee Leuven (women) players
Spanish expatriate women's footballers
Spanish expatriate sportspeople in Belgium
Expatriate women's footballers in Belgium
Women's association football midfielders
Spain women's youth international footballers